Sandnessjøen is a town and the administrative centre of Alstahaug Municipality in Nordland county, Norway.  Sandnessjøen was granted special trading privileges in the late 1600s and it received town status in 1999.  Sandnessjøen is located on the island of Alsta, just west of the De syv søstre (The Seven Sisters) mountain range.

The town is a transportation hub for the Helgeland region, as well as a commercial and business centre for the region.

Sandnessjøen Airport, Stokka is located south of the town.  Beginning in late June 2011, the regional airline Widerøe launched direct flights in summer between Sandnessjøen Airport and Oslo Airport, Gardermoen.

History

The town of Sandnessjøen was the administrative centre of the old municipality of Stamnes from 1899 to 1965. This municipality was also known as Sandnessjøen from 1948 until 1965.  In 1965, the municipality was merged with Alstahaug Municipality.

Helgeland Kammerkor, a mixed choir with members drawn from the region of Helgeland, was founded in Sandnessjøen in 1992 and has held many concerts there.

Notable people

See also
 List of towns and cities in Norway

References

External links
 "Pictures from Alstahaug" Some pictures from the Alstahaug area.
 sandnessjoen.com - local portal for Sandnessjøen and Alstahaug

Alstahaug
Populated places in Nordland
Cities and towns in Norway